Kopriva Peak is the rocky peak rising to 1140 m at the south extremity of Wolseley Buttress on the southeast side of Detroit Plateau on Nordenskjöld Coast in Graham Land, Antarctica.  It surmounts Albone Glacier to the east and Edgeworth Glacier to the west.

The peak is named after the settlement of Kopriva in Western Bulgaria.

Location

Maps
 Antarctic Digital Database (ADD). Scale 1:250000 topographic map of Antarctica. Scientific Committee on Antarctic Research (SCAR). Since 1993, regularly upgraded and updated.

Notes

References
 Kopriva Peak. SCAR Composite Antarctic Gazetteer.
 Bulgarian Antarctic Gazetteer. Antarctic Place-names Commission. (details in Bulgarian, basic data in English)

External links
 Kopriva Peak. Copernix satellite image

Mountains of Graham Land
Bulgaria and the Antarctic
Nordenskjöld Coast